Blue Rock is an unincorporated community in western Blue Rock Township, Muskingum County, Ohio, United States. It is a part of the Franklin Local School District. Blue Rock State Park is located within Blue Rock, Ohio.

Although Blue Rock is unincorporated, it has a post office, with the ZIP code of 43720, which is located in the similarly unincorporated community of Gaysport,  which lies along the Muskingum River at the intersection of State Routes 60 and 376.

References

Unincorporated communities in Ohio
Unincorporated communities in Muskingum County, Ohio